Ken Riley (1947–2020) was an American football player.

Ken Riley may refer to:

Ken Riley (physicist), English physicist
Ken Riley (priest) (born 1940), English priest